Federico Martín Rodríguez Rodríguez (born 3 April 1991) is a Uruguayan footballer who plays as a forward for Primera División side Alianza Lima. He represented Uruguay U20 national team.

Rodríguez also holds Spanish nationality, it made him unrestricted to be register as a player of Serie A club despite born outside the European Union.

Club career
On 30 January 2011 Rodríguez was signed by Italian Serie A club Genoa for €44.12 million from Peñarol. In June 2011 he was swapped directly with Riccardo Meggiorini, both 50% registration rights were "valued" €3 million. He signed a 4-year contract. On 25 January 2012 he was signed by Piacenza. In January 2013 he was signed by Montevideo Wanderers. On 21 June Bologna acquired Rodríguez for free and Robert Acquafresca outright from Genoa for €1.267 million.

Rodríguez was released on 21 January 2015, 6 months early from his contract. He joined FC Lugano immediately.

International career
He has been capped by the Uruguay national under-20 football team for the 2011 South American Youth Championship and for the 2011 FIFA U-20 World Cup.

International goals

|- 
| 1. || 19 January 2011 || Estadio Monumental Virgen de Chapi, Arequipa, Peru ||  || 1–1 || 1–1 || 2011 South American Youth Championship
|- 
| 2. || 7 July 2011 || Estádio Brinco de Ouro da Princesa, Campinas, Brazil ||  || 3–0 || 3–0 || Friendly
|}

References

1991 births
Living people
Uruguayan footballers
Uruguay under-20 international footballers
Peñarol players
Genoa C.F.C. players
Bologna F.C. 1909 players
Piacenza Calcio 1919 players
Montevideo Wanderers F.C. players
C.A. Bella Vista players
FC Locarno players
Boston River players
Danubio F.C. players
Club Alianza Lima footballers
Uruguayan Primera División players
Peruvian Primera División players
Serie A players
Serie C players
Expatriate footballers in Italy
Expatriate footballers in Switzerland
Expatriate footballers in Peru
Uruguayan expatriate sportspeople in Italy
Uruguayan expatriate sportspeople in Switzerland
Uruguayan expatriate sportspeople in Peru
Association football forwards